Kevin Mac Allister (born 7 November 1997) is an Argentine professional footballer who plays as a right-back for Argentinos Juniors.

Club career
Mac Allister, like his two brothers, started his career with Argentinos Juniors. His first appearance for the Argentinos first-team came on 27 February 2016, in a 4–1 defeat to Estudiantes. Three more appearances followed in his debut season of 2016. The club was relegated in that campaign, Mac Allister subsequently made sixteen appearances in Primera B Nacional as Argentinos won the title. He scored his first senior goal in March 2018 against Gimnasia y Esgrima. Mac Allister joined Boca Juniors on loan in January 2019.

International career
Mac Allister received a call-up to the Argentina U20 squad for the 2017 South American Youth Football Championship in Ecuador. However, he missed the tournament through injury.

Personal life

Kevin Mac Allister has two brothers, Alexis and Francis, who are also professional footballers. They are the sons of Carlos Mac Allister and nephews of Patricio Mac Allister.

Career statistics
.

Honours
Argentinos Juniors
Primera B Nacional: 2016–17

References

External links

1997 births
Living people
Footballers from Buenos Aires
Argentine people of Scottish descent
Argentine people of Irish descent
Argentine footballers
Association football defenders
Argentine Primera División players
Primera Nacional players
Argentinos Juniors footballers
Boca Juniors footballers
Kevin